Ark John Archer Primary Academy (formerly High View Primary School) is a co-educational primary school and Grade II listed building located at Plough Road in the Battersea area of London, England.

History
The school was built in a Flemish Renaissance style for the London School Board in 1890 by architect T. J. Bailey.

Previously a community school administered by Wandsworth London Borough Council, in September 2018 High View Primary School converted to academy status and was renamed Ark John Archer Primary Academy. The school is now sponsored by Ark Schools, and is named after John Archer, a former Mayor of Battersea Borough, and the first black mayor in London.

References

External links

Educational institutions established in 1890
1890 establishments in England
Primary schools in the London Borough of Wandsworth
Grade II listed buildings in the London Borough of Wandsworth
Academies in the London Borough of Wandsworth
Ark schools